András Gosztonyi (born 19 June 1933) is a Hungarian sailor. He competed in the Star event at the 1972 Summer Olympics.

References

External links
 

1933 births
Living people
Hungarian male sailors (sport)
Olympic sailors of Hungary
Sailors at the 1972 Summer Olympics – Star
Sportspeople from Budapest
20th-century Hungarian people